The UNIVAC 1105 was a follow-on computer to the UNIVAC 1103A introduced by Sperry Rand in September 1958.  The UNIVAC 1105 used 21 types of vacuum tubes, 11 types of diodes, 10 types of transistors, and three core types.

The UNIVAC 1105 had either 8,192 or 12,288 words of 36-bit magnetic core memory, in two or three banks of 4,096 words each. Magnetic drum memory provided either 16,384 or 32,768 words, in one or two drums with 16,384 words each. Sixteen to twenty-four UNISERVO II tape drives were connected, with a maximum capacity (not counting block overhead) of 1,200,000 words per tape.

Fixed-point numbers had a one-bit sign and a 35-bit value, with negative values represented in ones' complement format. Floating-point numbers had a one-bit sign, an eight-bit characteristic, and a 27-bit mantissa. Instructions had a six-bit operation code and two 15-bit operand addresses.

A complete UNIVAC 1105 computer system required 160 kW of power (175 KVA, 0.9 power factor) and an air conditioning unit with a power of at least 35 tons (123 kW) for cooling input water. The floor space for the computer was approximately 3,752 ft2 (350 m2). The power, refrigeration and equipment room was approximately 2,450 ft2 (230 m2).

Cost, price and rental rates

Chapel Hill
In 1959, a Univac 1105 located in the basement of Phillips Hall of The University of North Carolina at Chapel Hill was one of three computers of its type. It was intended primarily for the United States Census Bureau, which had one of its own; Armour Institute of Technology had the other. The Chapel Hill unit cost $2.4 million, with the improvements to the basement, including 16-inch concrete walls to protect it from nuclear attack, added $1.2 million. Its memory was less than 50 kilobytes, or one 8 1/2 x 11 document, with the capability of adding 30,000 numbers per second. The Univac was 60 feet long, weighed 19 tons, and used 7200 vacuum tubes. Its printer had a speed of 600 lines per minute.

See also
List of UNIVAC products
History of computing hardware
List of vacuum tube computers

References

External links 

 BRL REPORT NO. 1115 March 1961: UNIVAC 1105 by Martin H. Weik

1105
Vacuum tube computers
36-bit computers
Computer-related introductions in 1958